Zhang Wo (or Zhang Wu, Chinese: 張渥), courtesy name as Shuhou, sobriquet as Zhenqisheng and Jianghaike, is a famed Chinese painter who was active during the Yuan Dynasty. Both his birth and death dates are unknown.

Zhang was born in Hangzhou in the Zhejiang province. His style name was 'Zhong Chun' and his sobriquet was 'Mi Gong'. Zhang's painting followed the fluent and pure style of Li Gonglin. Zhang specialized in painting human figures.

References

Artists from Hangzhou
Yuan dynasty painters
Year of death unknown
Year of birth unknown
Painters from Zhejiang